The following article presents a summary of the 2009–10 football (soccer) season in Croatia, which is the 19th season of competitive football in the country.

National team
The home team is on the left column; the away team is on the right column.

Friendly matches

2010 World Cup qualifiers

League tables

Prva HNL

Druga HNL

Honours

Croatian clubs in Europe

Summary

Dinamo Zagreb

Slaven Belupo

Rijeka

Hajduk Split

References